The 47th Arizona State Legislature, consisting of the Arizona State Senate and the Arizona House of Representatives, was constituted in Phoenix from January 1, 2005, to December 31, 2006, during the second two years of Janet Napolitano's first term in office. Both the Senate and the House membership remained constant at 30 and 60, respectively. The Republicans gained a seat in the Senate, giving them an 18-12 majority. The Republicans maintained their majority in the lower chamber, 39–21, while the Democrats picked up the sole seat held by an Independent.

Sessions
The Legislature met for two regular sessions at the State Capitol in Phoenix. The first opened on January 10, 2005, and adjourned on May 13, while the Second Regular Session convened on January 9, 2006, and adjourned sine die on June 22.

There was a single Special Session, which convened on January 24, 2006, and adjourned sine die on March 6.

State Senate

Members

The asterisk (*) denotes members of the previous Legislature who continued in office as members of this Legislature.

House of Representatives

Members 
The asterisk (*) denotes members of the previous Legislature who continued in office as members of this Legislature.

References

External links
 

Arizona legislative sessions
2005 in Arizona
2006 in Arizona
2005 U.S. legislative sessions
2006 U.S. legislative sessions